Iroquois Plateau is a large, mainly ice-covered plateau situated east of the southern part of the Washington Escarpment in the Pensacola Mountains of Edith Ronne Land, Antarctica. It was mapped by the United States Geological Survey from surveys and U.S. Navy air photos, 1956–66, and was named by the Advisory Committee on Antarctic Names after the Bell UH-1 Iroquois helicopter which has greatly facilitated field operations in Antarctica.

References

Plateaus of Antarctica
Landforms of Queen Elizabeth Land